Verkhnealkashevo (Ürge Älkäş) is a rural locality (a village) in Ismailovsky Selsoviet, Dyurtyulinsky District, Bashkortostan, Russia. The population was 109 as of 2010. There are 2 streets.

Geography 
Verkhnealkashevo is located 19 km west of Dyurtyuli (the district's administrative centre) by road. Nizhnealkashevo is the nearest rural locality.

References 

Rural localities in Dyurtyulinsky District